Beşiktaş J.K. Youth System is the youth system of football department of Turkish sports club Beşiktaş J.K. As of 2020, Beşiktaş Youth System is operated between age groups of 8 and 19.

The senior (oldest) section of Beşiktaş J.K. Youth System competed up to age group of 21 until the end of 2018–19, when Turkish Football Federation announced the termination of U21 Ligi.

The senior section were formerly known as "Beşiktaş J.K. Genç Takımı", "Beşiktaş J.K. Amatör" or "Beşiktaş J.K. B Takımı" until 1996, "Beşiktaş J.K. PAF Takımı" between 1996 and 2009, "Beşiktaş J.K. A2" between 2009 and 2014 and, "Beşiktaş J.K. U-21" between 2014 and 2019. Since 2019–20 season, the senior section is the age group of 19 (U-19).

History

Football department of Beşiktaş was established in 1911, where shortly after the department merged with "Basiret" and "Valideçeşme", two other football teams located in Beşiktaş district of Istanbul, there were 3 different reserve teams formed.

In 1943, Süleyman Seba (1926–2014) was recruited for Beşiktaş Genç Takımı, while playing at high school level football at Kabataş Erkek Lisesi. In 1946, Seba got promoted onto senior squad. Süleyman Seba later became the president of Beşiktaş between 1984 and 2000.

During 1963–64 Balkans Cup, Beşiktaş were requested to play two back-to-back away games within 2 days. Due to logistic challenges Beşiktaş B Team represented the club at senior level football played in Tirana, Albania, facing KS Dinamo Tirana on 17 October 1963. The match ended 2–0 in favour of Albanian side.

Under Management of Serpil Hamdi Tüzün and financial support of club official Atıf Keçeli, Beşiktaş J.K. formed a youth investment program, named "Beşiktaş Özkaynak Düzeni", aiming to promote youngsters for professional level, was established in 1975. In 1978, Ziya Doğan, Süleyman Oktay and Fuat Yaman were the first ever graduates those promoted onto senior team. In following four seasons, Fikret Demirer, Burhan Ertürk were promoted.

Following a 3 wins and 1 draw performance in total of 4 games, beating Orduspor Amatör with 2–1 score at final held in Aydın, Beşiktaş Amatör won 1985 Turkish Amateur Football Championship. This success qualified Beşiktaş Amatör to participate at 1985–86 Turkish Cup, in which they were eliminated by PTT at Round 1 by a 1–0 final score.

On 6 March 1988, beating Denizli Belediyespor with 2–0 final score, Beşiktaş Amatör won 1988 Turkish Amateur Football Championship.

In Round 3 of 1988–89 Turkish Cup, Beşiktaş J.K. senior team drew Beşiktaş Amatör, in order to play a 2-legged-round by games to be played respectively 25 January and 1 February 1989. Beşiktaş J.K. seniors beat Beşiktaş Amatör 4–0 at first encounter. Goals of senior team were scored by Metin Tekin, Mehmet Özdilek and Halim Okta (two goals). Held at Fenerbahçe Stadium on 1 February 1989, following a 5–1 win in front of 923 recorded spectators, Beşiktaş J.K. seniors eliminated Beşikaş Amatör with 9–1 aggregate score.

On 7 May 1995, Beşiktaş PAF drew Fenerbahçe PAF with 1–1 final score and secured the PAF Ligi title at penultimate round of 1994–95 season.

PAF team won the title after 2002–03 season, colloquially known as the club's centenary year.

On 14 May 2006, at last game of 2005–06 season, Beşiktaş PAF were beaten by Trabzonspor PAF with a 3–0 final score as team completed the game 2 men down following 2 red cards shown, and finished the season on 3rd place.

In the second half of the 2008–09 season, Beşiktaş J.K. U-21 alumnus Sergen Yalçın managed the team on a 6-month spell, with an undefeated tally.

In 2013, youth ladies section was established.

In 2014, there were 19 players trained by Beşiktaş J.K. U-21, in which 2 players played senior level for club and 17 were hired by other clubs.

On 2 December 2016, during a U-21 derby encounter held at Fenerbahçe Lefter Küçükandonyadis Facilities, hosting side Fenerbahçe U-21 ran out of their three substitution quota and they had to play down to 10-man due to the injury of Alparslan Demir picked up in second half, Beşiktaş U-21 coach Yasin Sülün substititued Sedat Şahintürk out on 74th minute and did not replace him with another player, letting the teams playing remaining 16 minutes 10 to 10 players. The game ended 3–1 in favour of Beşiktaş U-21.

On 23 May 2018, Beşiktaş U-21 beat Balıkesirspor U-21 and won the U-21 Super Cup. Following the 2–2 score at normal period, the game prolonged and winning goal was scored by Burak Yamaç at 118th minute that sealed 3–2 final score.

Following abrogation of U-21 League by TFF in July 2019, U-21 level of Beşiktaş youth sector was dissolved.

In July 2020, club announced that their cooperation with former German international olayer Fabian Ernst, who also played at Beşiktaş between 2009 and 2012, to establish youth academies across continental Europe, focusing Germany, Austria and, the Netherlands.

On 16 September 2020, club confirmed 7 players and 5 personnel were tested positive for COVID-19 amidst the COVID-19 pandemic. Following the diagnosis, club management cancelled the training sessions for indefinite period.

Timeline

Results

Beşiktaş Amatör results

Turkish Cup

U-21 results

League (1996–2019)

Background colours: Gold=winners; Silver=runners-up; Bronze=third

U-19 results

League (2013–)

Background colours: Gold=winners; Silver=runners-up; Bronze=third

UEFA Youth League (2013–)

Honours

U-21
 Turkish Amateur Football Championship
 Winners (2): 1985, 1988
 Istanbul Amateur Football Istanbul League
 Winners (1): 1994–85
 PAF Ligi
 Winners (5): 1990–91, 1994–95, 1995–96, 1999–2000, 2002–03
 U-21 Süper Ligi 
 Winners (1): 2017–18
 U-21 Super Cup
 Winners (1): 2018

U-19
 U-19 Elite League
 Winners (1): 2014–15
 U-19 Super Cup
 Winners (1): 2014–15

Individual
U21 Ligi Top Scorer (2): 2004–05 (Adem Büyük, 26 goals), 2015–16 (Hamza Küçükköylü, 26 goals)

Squads

U-19 Squad

U-17 Squad

Staff
As of 1 October 2020.

Established graduates

Following players achieved to play at youth divisions of Beşiktaş at least 3 seasons, made their professional debut at Beşiktaş senior squad and, represented their country at youth (at least U-19) or full international levels:

References
 Footnotes

 Citations

External links
 Beşiktaş official website
 U-21 Süper Ligi stats at TFF
 U-19 Elite Ligi stats at TFF
 U-17 Elite Ligi stats at TFF

Football Academy
Football academies in Turkey
A2 Ligi clubs
UEFA Youth League teams